NLCF can refer to:

New Life Christian Fellowship, a church in Blacksburg, Virginia
National Leadership Computing Facility